Einhänder is a scrolling shooter developed by Square for the PlayStation console. It was released in Japan on November 20, 1997 and in North America on May 5, 1998. It was also re-released for the Japanese PlayStation Network on June 25, 2008. The name Einhänder is German and denotes a type of sword that is wielded with one hand, here used to refer to the single manipulator arm possessed by the player's spacecraft.

The game is based on the story of the Greek's mythology of Selene and Endymion and set in a fictional future during a war between the Earth and the Moon. The player is part of the Moon's forces and must invade enemy territories to gather reconnaissance and enemy weapons. The music of the game, mainly in a techno/trance style, was composed by Kenichiro Fukui and was published in Japan as a soundtrack album. The game received positive reviews from critics, who praised its gameplay and graphics, but felt the game's short duration and lack of two-player mode were minor flaws.

Gameplay

Einhänder is a shoot 'em up game of the scrolling shooter subgenre in the tradition of games like Gradius, in which the player controls a fighter spacecraft that must destroy enemy craft in side-scrolling levels. The game's graphics are in 2.5D, that is, in 3D with occasional shifting of camera angles, but with the player's movement restricted to a two-dimensional plane. Pre-rendered full motion videos are used to illustrate pivotal scenes between stages.

The player can choose between multiple difficulty settings and three different models of the "Einhänder" fighter, in addition to two secret ones. The Japanese version also features a difficulty setting called "Free", which grants unlimited continues but disables the score. The player's fighter can move at different speeds and is equipped with a default machine gun as well as a manipulator arm, which is used to collect gunpods left by destroyed enemies. Gunpods have varying amounts of power, ammunition and range, and include cannons, guided missile launchers, aircraft-sized lightsabers and other types of weapons. Gunpods depleted of ammunition are discarded. They can be switched between an overhead and below-the-belly position, causing them to fire at different angles or directions. Most stages have a middle boss and an end boss, which often possess a main core and individual parts that can be destroyed.

The game's score system is based on a multiplier bar and a hit gauge counter. As the player destroys enemy cores, the hit counter increases. Points awarded for destroyed cores are multiplied by the value of the hit counter. The counter decreases when the player stops destroying cores. However, if the multiplier reaches a certain amount it will begin to flash, awarding large point bonuses for any cores destroyed during this short period of time.

Plot
Einhänder takes place in a fictional future during a war between the Earth colony, Sodom and the Moon colony, Selene. The "First Moon War" resulted in the destruction of most of the Earth's surface and the creation of a totalitarian regime on the planet. The game recounts the events of the "Second Moon War" in which the Moon attacks the Earth again for natural resources. Selene's tactics consists of sending one-man fighter spacecraft called "Einhänder" on kamikaze missions to cause as much damage as possible on the planet before being destroyed. The player takes on the role of one of these pilots attacking the Earth capital city.

As the player progresses through the game, the Selenean military satellite Hyperion relays command orders and objectives. The on-board central computer "EOS" synthesizes orders. EOS also records and relays the player's flight and battle record data back to Hyperion. After completion of the last objective Hyperion informs the player that the battle pattern of the latest EOS unmanned fighter is complete. The player is given the honor of being the target of the last EOS test as reward for their heroic efforts. Upon the player's death they will advance two classes and be awarded the Sirius decoration. After surviving the intense barrage of artillery fire of the test, the pilot wonders why they must be terminated by their allies and questions their military leaders' rationale for the war.

The game's narrative then skips to one month later when the pilot re-emerges in space flying an armed Einhänder spacecraft. Hyperion communicates that the player is committing an act of treason and must remove their armament and surrender. Still, the player fights their way through the Selenean fighters and faces the Hyperion, the game's final boss. The ending sequence depicts the player's spacecraft damaged and drifting in space. The pilot engages its thrusters and dives into an army of Selenean spacecraft with the Moon in the background. An epilogue shows the actions of the lone Einhänder pilot ended the war by destroying the armies of both sides — leading to an eventual peace. Yet, the pilot's name and deeds were stricken from the records and they are remembered only by veterans of the war. In a post-credits scene, a lone Einhänder spacecraft is shown powering up.

Development
Einhänder was the first 3D shooter developed by Square, a company otherwise mostly known for their role-playing video games. It was directed by Tatsuo Fujii, who had previously worked at Konami as a programmer on shooters such as Gradius II and Xexex. The developers used German terms extensively for naming things in the game, in addition to a number of references from Greek mythology and the Bible. According to the gaming website IGN, a lot of the effects Square learned from creating Final Fantasy VII were also put in use in Einhänder. The game was showcased at the Tokyo Game Show in September 1997 and was initially planned for a Japanese release on October 16, 1997. Square released an unrelated game the following month, Chocobo no Fushigina Dungeon, which came with a bonus "Mysterious Data Disc" featuring memory card data for various Square games, including Einhänder.

The American publisher Working Designs was interested in publishing the game in North America for its Spaz brand of shoot 'em ups, but could not as Sony Computer Entertainment used their priority over Square titles to publish the game themselves. For the North American version, the speed of the arm switching was increased and some power-ups were altered; the game mode called "Free" was removed; and the Gallery was given a modified interface and different pictures than those from the Japanese version. The game was not released in Europe. On June 25, 2008, Square Enix re-released the game as a digital download on the Japanese PlayStation Network.

Music

The music of Einhänder was composed, arranged, and produced by Kenichiro Fukui. Several tracks make use of genres of electronic music, such as progressive house, or other genres like hip hop, piano-based music or opera. The soundtrack of the game was published in Japan by DigiCube, a subsidiary of Square, on December 21, 1997, and was reissued by Square Enix on July 18, 2007, after DigiCube's bankruptcy. The final track, titled "Beginning", was also featured on Square Enix Music Compilation 2, a compilation album published on May 1, 2008 for members of the Japanese Square Enix website.

Related media
A 111-page official strategy guide, titled Einhänder Official Guidebook, was published in Japan by ASCII Corporation in December 1997. Its content includes stage maps, information on the spacecraft and data tables.

The development team behind Einhänder worked on the Gummi Ship portions for Kingdom Hearts III. In a similar vein as with Final Fantasy and The World Ends with You in previous Kingdom Hearts games, Einhänder is represented in Kingdom Hearts III in the form of the Endymion being a Gummi Ship and Schwarzgeist being a secret boss in the Gummi Ship portions of the game along with a remix of the latter's theme.

Reception

The game received "generally favorable reviews", just one point shy of "universal acclaim", according to the review aggregation website Metacritic. In Japan, Famitsu gave it a score of 31 out of 40.

American gaming publications stated that the game was especially notable for a shoot 'em up as it had no strong competitor on the PlayStation at the time of its release. The website AllGame referred to the game as the best side scrolling shooter "to come out in the post 16-bit era of video gaming", while Eurogamer called it "the most successful of Square's expeditions into non-RPG territory". Next Generation said in an early review that the game "makes no effort to be anything more than a traditional shooter, with the addition of 3D backgrounds and enemies, but waiting to see what's next is a rewarding experience, as any game should be. It's a welcome challenge for those gamers dying to play a good shooter; and hopefully, Einhander can inject some life into a moribund genre."

The gameplay was praised by critics. AllGame lauded the game's intense action and diversity of spacecraft, the gun pod system and the fact that bosses are composed of different destructible parts. GamePro noted that while the gameplay scheme is common to other shoot 'em ups, the title's "thumb-busting" action and variety of weaponry made for an enjoyable experience. The site called diversity "one of the game's biggest assets". GameSpot further called the game's play mechanics "finely tuned" and featuring a "fascinating" plot, while IGN felt the tilting camera angles were one of the features that make the game "so exciting".

Concerning the graphics, GameSpot, AllGame and Official U.S. PlayStation Magazine appreciated the level of details and effects used in the different stages, as well as the large size of the bosses. IGN noted that the game's 3D graphics made it look "substantially better" than most of the other, sprite-based, shoot 'em up games of the time.

The soundtrack of the game was praised by reviewers such as Eurogamer, IGN, Soundtrack Central and Official U.S. PlayStation Magazine.' GamePro noted that the techno music and sound effects fit the stages "perfectly". However, GameSpot felt that the quality of the music and sound effects were "good" but globally not on par with that of the graphics. The game's short duration and lack of a two-player mode were noted as the game's only flaws by AllGame and GamePro. GameSpot estimated that the game demands "just over an hour" to complete.

In Japan, Einhänder had sold 50,000 units three days after its release, and 100,000 units as of February 1999.

The game was a runner-up for the "Best Action Game" and "Best Graphics" awards at the 1998 OPM Editors' Awards, both of which went to Crash Bandicoot: Warped.

In 2007, IGN ranked it first in a top ten of the best 2D space shooters.

Notes

References

External links
 
 Official North American website from Square, retrieved from the Internet Archive
 Official Japanese homepage from Square Enix 

1997 video games
Electronic compositions
Fictional spacecraft
Horizontally scrolling shooters
PlayStation (console) games
PlayStation Network games
Post-apocalyptic video games
Science fiction video games
Single-player video games
Sony Interactive Entertainment games
Square (video game company) games
Video games based on Greek mythology
Video games developed in Japan
Video games scored by Kenichiro Fukui
Video games set in the 23rd century
Video games with 2.5D graphics
World War III video games